Barker Road Methodist Church (BRMC) is a Methodist church  in Singapore located at 48 Barker Road along Dunearn Road, and is colocated with Anglo-Chinese School (Barker Road) and Anglo-Chinese School (Primary).

History
BRMC was originally known as the Barker Road Chapel, and had its beginnings in 1956. It was later recognised as a Methodist church on 26 May 1957 with 12 registered members who were mainly Anglo-Chinese School boys.

In 2016, membership of the Church stood at 2,742.

BRMC is associated with the revival of Christian emphasis in the Anglo-Chinese School in the 1950s, and again in ACS Clock Tower Charismatic revival in 1972, when it hosted Anglo-Chinese School boys in the Church Sanctuary. Several participants in the revival later served as pastors in the Church.

The Church was one of the founding members of the National Council of Churches of Singapore.

Church Buildings

The first purpose-built building was completed in 1963, and was dedicated by Bishop F. Lundy n 31 October 1965. It was extensively renovated and enlarged in 1989 before finally being demolished in 1999, when the entire Barker Road campus comprising the school and Oldham hall were redeveloped. The new church buildings were completed in 2002, and form an integral part of the campus. The new building, although not architecturally significant, is large and seats a congregation of several hundred. It is a simple rectangular building surmounted a large tiled hipped roof. The interior is plain and utilitarian space, without any features of note, lit by plain fluorescent tubes. There is a small, simple stained glass window at the liturgical east end, re-used from the earlier building. The church has a large 4-manual digital organ by Allen Organs. There is a diminutive bell turret on the exterior, containing 5 bells, presented to the church by the 12th Singapore Company of the Boys' Brigade.

Church Planting
In October 1993, the Church, together with Wesley Methodist Church launched a church-planting project at the Methodist Girls' School with the opening of a preaching point. It was later constituted as Covenant Community Methodist Church in September 1994.

A similar preaching point was established at Anglo-Chinese School (Independent) in 1998 in partnership with Wesley Methodist Church and Aldersgate Methodist Church, and was later constituted as Living Waters Methodist Church in April 2003.

In July 2007, BRMC opened a preaching point at Anglo-Chinese School (International). This preaching point was later constituted as Holland Village Methodist Church in 2012.

BRMC currently maintains a preaching point at Bukit Batok, located at Block 151, Bukit Batok Street 11.

Affiliated Organizations
BRMC also looks after the spiritual well-being of the following schools under the Anglo-Chinese School umbrella
 Anglo-Chinese School (Barker Road)
 Anglo-Chinese School (Primary)
 Anglo-Chinese School Oldham Hall
 The Boys' Brigade in Singapore 12th Company

It also hosts a popular kindergarten, Barker Road Methodist Church Kindergarten, where its 420 places are snapped up by "parents still in the maternity ward".

In 2001, the Church launched what was to become MCYC Community Services Society in a joint project with the welfare arm of Methodist Church in Singapore, the Methodist Welfare Services. MCYC Community Services Society is one of two Voluntary Welfare Organisations in Singapore that have been selected as Fostering Agencies by the Ministry of Social and Family Development.

The Church hosts a sizeable Indonesian and Filipino congregation. The Filipino congregation celebrated its 32nd Anniversary in 2015, with Ambassador of the Philippines in Singapore attending.

Notable Events
The Church organised and hosted several events that were relevant to the members of the public at large, and received coverage from the press. These include a forum on "Educational problems facing families in Singapore", a forum on "Family Life Problems"  and a forum on "Approaches to Drug Problems".

The Church also played host to the Boys' Brigade in Singapore during the Brigade's Thanksgiving Services.

References

Further reading
i

External links
Official website of Barker Road Methodist Church
Official website of the Methodist Church in Singapore

Methodism in Asia
Methodist churches in Singapore
Churches in Singapore